Lekhziri Glacier is a valley glacier located on the southern slopes of the Greater Caucasus Mountain Range in the Svaneti Region of Georgia. Lekhziri consists of three separate glaciers; North, East and West Lekhziri. From the point where the three different glaciers intersect, the surface of Lekhziri becomes largely covered with morainal sediments and debris. The glacier feeds off the ice-flows and avalanches from the adjacent mountains.

See also
Glaciers of Georgia

References 
 Georgian State (Soviet) Encyclopedia. 1983. Book 6. p. 209.

Glaciers of Georgia (country)
Svaneti